The 2018–19 season is Queens Park Rangers' fourth consecutive season in the Championship following their relegation from the Premier League in the 2014–15 season. Along with the Championship, the club will participate in the FA Cup and the EFL Cup.

The season covers the period from 1 July 2018 to 30 June 2019.

Players

First team squad

Kit
Supplier: Erreà / Sponsor: Royal Panda

Kit information
QPR agreed a multi-year partnership with Erreà as the official technical kit suppliers, the 2018/19 season will be the second year of the deal. The kits will be 100 per-cent bespoke designs for the duration of the deal.

The 2018/19 season will be the second-year of a three-year shirt sponsorship deal with online casino Royal Panda.

New contracts

Transfers

Transfers in

Loans in

Transfers out

Loans out

Friendlies
For the 2018/19 season, QPR announced pre-season friendlies against Charlton Athletic, Barnet, Staines Town, AFC Wimbledon, 1899 Hoffenheim and FC Union Berlin.

Competitions

Overview

Goals

Clean sheets

Disciplinary record

Awards

External awards

Managerial and boardroom

References

Queens Park Rangers F.C. seasons
Queens Park Rangers